An election to Carlow County Council took place on 23 May 2014 as part of that year's Irish local elections. 18 councillors were elected from two electoral divisions by PR-STV voting for a five-year term of office. Ahead of the 2014 election Carlow was redrawn into two electoral areas, a reduction in three from five, and the number of councillors was reduced to 18, from a previous total of 21. Carlow Town Council and Muinebheag Town Council were both abolished.

While Fine Gael remained the largest party after the election, in terms of seats though not in terms of vote share, they lost two fifths of their councillors. Their colleagues in Government, the Labour Party, lost three fifths of their councillors being reduced to just 2 seats. Fianna Fáil gained a seat to return 5 members and reported a higher vote than Fine Gael but the big winners were Sinn Féin who won 3 seats to supplant Labour as the traditional third largest party.

Results by party

Results by Electoral Area

Carlow

Muinebheag

References

Changes since 2014
† Carlow Fianna Fáil Cllr Jennifer Murnane-O'Connor was elected to Seanad Éireann in April 2016. Her brother, Ken, was co-opted to fill the vacancy on 9 June 2016.
†† Carlow Fianna Fáil Cllr Anne Ahern née Long resigned her seat on 11 September 2017 upon being appointed a School Principal. On 9 October 2017 Andrea Dalton was co-opted to fill the vacancy.

External links
 Official website

2014 Irish local elections
2014